Psellonus is a monotypic genus of Indian running crab spiders containing the single species, Psellonus planus. It was first described by Eugène Louis Simon in 1897, and is only found in India.

See also
 List of Philodromidae species

References

Monotypic Araneomorphae genera
Philodromidae
Spiders of the Indian subcontinent